Tanongsak Prajakkata (Thai ทนงสักธิ์ ประจักกะตา) (born June 29, 1976) is a Thai former professional football player. he is the currently assistant coach of Thai League 2 club Chiangmai . He is a defender who scored 3 goals for the national team. He played for BEC Tero Sasana in the ASEAN Club Championship 2003, where the club finished runners-up.

International goals

References 

1976 births
Living people
Tanongsak Prajakkata
Tanongsak Prajakkata
2000 AFC Asian Cup players
Tanongsak Prajakkata
Tanongsak Prajakkata
Tanongsak Prajakkata
Tanongsak Prajakkata
Tanongsak Prajakkata
Tanongsak Prajakkata
Tanongsak Prajakkata
Association football defenders
Tanongsak Prajakkata